Seta Station (瀬田駅) is the name of two train stations in Japan:

Seta Station (Kumamoto)
 Seta Station (Shiga)